Mohammad Abdur Rouf (born 1 February 1934) is a retired justice of the Bangladesh Supreme Court. He started as a practicing advocate and then became an additional judge of the High Court Division. He was then raised to Appellate Division of the court, and was later appointed as Chief Election Commissioner by the President of Bangladesh. He is currently a Shariah advisor to Fareast Islami Life Insurance Company Limited and Prime Islami Life Insurance. Rouf also serves as the president of the national children organization, Phulkuri Ashar.

Early life
Rouf was born on 1 February 1934 in the district of Mymensingh.

Career
He was a practising advocate of Bangladesh Supreme Court and was elevated to the bench of the High Court Division as an additional judge on 29 January 1982 and confirmed on 26 January 1984. He was elevated to the Appellate Division of the Supreme Court on 8 June 1995. While in the post of Justice in the High Court Division, he was appointed as the chief election commissioner 25 December 1990 by the President of Bangladesh Justice Sahabuddin Ahmed. He was appointed the chief election commissioner on 25 December 1990 replacing Justice Sultan Hossain Khan. On 18 April 1995, he left the chief election commission post and was replaced by Justice A. K. M. Sadeq. 

Later Rouf returned to the post of justice, elevated to the Appellate Division and retired on 1 February 1999.

Rouf held positions in many non-profit social welfare organization. He served as the chairman of the board of trustees of Hamdard Laboratories (WAQF) Bangladesh from 2001 to 2009. He was appointed as the President of the Board of Advisers of Phulkuri Ashar.

References

1934 births
Living people
Bangladeshi judges
People from Mymensingh District
Chief Election Commissioners of Bangladesh
Supreme Court of Bangladesh justices